Robert Norton may refer to:

Politicians
Robert Norton (Leicester MP) represented Leicester (UK Parliament constituency)
Robert Norton (British politician), British Conservative politician
Robert Norton (parliamentarian), MP for Warwick (UK Parliament constituency)
Robert Norton (Virginia politician), former slave and member of the Virginia House of Delegates

Others
Robert Norton (boxer)
Bob Norton (Robert Cecil York Norton; 1922–1992), Australian dentist
Robert Norton (typographer) (1929–2001), printer and publisher